|}

The Grosser Preis von Baden is a Group 1 flat horse race in Germany open to thoroughbreds aged three years or older. It is run at Baden-Baden over a distance of 2,400 metres (about 1½ miles), and it is scheduled to take place each year in early September.

History
The event was established in 1858, and it was originally contested over 3,200 metres. The inaugural running was part of a three-day festival which celebrated the opening of Baden-Baden's Iffezheim Racecourse.

The race was shortened to 2,800 metres in 1887. It was titled the Jubiläums-Preis on several occasions during the 1890s. Its distance was cut to 2,200 metres in 1894, and extended to 2,400 metres in 1898.

The Grosser Preis von Baden was staged at Hoppegarten from 1942 to 1944. It was not contested from 1945 to 1947, and it was known as the Grosser Preis von Iffezheim in 1948 and 1949.

The present system of race grading was introduced in Germany in 1972, and the Grosser Preis von Baden was classed at Group 1 level. It was run in two separate divisions in 1974.

The race has had several different sponsors since the mid-1990s, and these have included Mercedes-Benz, Volkswagen and Longines.

The Grosser Preis von Baden was added to the Breeders' Cup Challenge series in 2012. The winner earned an automatic invitation to compete in the same year's Breeders' Cup Turf. The race was removed from the series after the 2017 running.

Records
Most successful horse (3 wins):
 Kincsem – 1877, 1878, 1879
 Oleander – 1927, 1928, 1929

Leading jockey (5 wins):
 Gerhard Streit – Magnat (1941), Samurai (1943), Mangon (1952), Baal (1954), Masetto (1956)

Leading trainer (7 wins):
 George Arnull – Oleander (1927, 1928, 1929), Alba (1930), Widerhall (1932), Magnat (1941), Samurai (1943)
 (note: the trainers of some of the early winners are unknown)

Leading owner (10 wins):
 Gestüt Schlenderhan – Gastgeber (1875), Oleander (1927, 1928, 1929), Alba (1930), Widerhall (1932), Magnat (1941), Samurai (1943), Alpenkönig (1970), Ivanhowe (2014)

Winners since 1968

* The race was run in two separate divisions in 1974.

Earlier winners

 1858: La Maladetta
 1859: Geologie
 1860: Capucine
 1861: Mon Etoile
 1862: Stradella
 1863: La Toucques
 1864: Vermouth
 1865: Vertugadin
 1866: Etoile Filante
 1867: Ruy Blas
 1868: Trocadero 1
 1869: Cerdagne
 1870: no race
 1871: Monseigneur
 1872: Dami
 1873: Hochstapler
 1874: Il Maestro
 1875: Gastgeber
 1876: Przedswit
 1877: Kincsem
 1878: Kincsem 2
 1879: Kincsem
 1880: Tallos
 1881: La Gondola
 1882: Lehetetlen
 1883: Brocken
 1884: Florence
 1885: Plaisanterie
 1886: Nero
 1887: Bulgar
 1888: Waverley
 1889: Tantale
 1890: Yellow
 1891: Le Capricorne
 1892: Perdican
 1893: Nickel
 1894: Ilse
 1895: Armbruster
 1896: Tokio
 1897: En Bloc
 1898: Slusohr
 1899: Gobseck
 1900: Xamete
 1901: Semendria
 1902: La Camargo
 1903: Vinicius
 1904: Exema
 1905: Gouvernant
 1906: Hautbois
 1907: Hammurabi
 1908: Faust
 1909: Azalee / Mademoiselle Bon 3
 1910: Ksiaze Pan
 1911: Badajoz
 1912: Rire aux Larmes
 1913: Mosci Ksiaze
 1914–20: no race
 1921: Ossian
 1922: Träumer
 1923: Ganelon
 1924: Scopas
 1925: Aditi
 1926: Indigo
 1927: Oleander
 1928: Oleander
 1929: Oleander
 1930: Alba
 1931: Sichel
 1932: Widerhall
 1933: Alchimist
 1934: Agalire
 1935: Athanasius
 1936: Wahnfried
 1937: Dadji
 1938: Procle
 1939: Trollius
 1940: no race
 1941: Magnat
 1942: Gradivo
 1943: Samurai
 1944: Ticino
 1945–47: no race
 1948: Der Löwe
 1949: Silberfasan
 1950: no race
 1951: Prince d'Ouilly
 1952: Mangon
 1953: Niederländer
 1954: Baal
 1955: Stani
 1956: Masetto
 1957: Windfang
 1958: Dushka
 1959: Malefaim
 1960: Sheshoon
 1961: Rio Marin
 1962: Kaiserstuhl
 1963: Espresso
 1964: Espresso
 1965: Demi Deuil
 1966: Atilla
 1967: Salvo

1 The 1868 winner was declared as Trocadero after a dead-heat with his stablemate Nelusco.2 The 1878 edition finished as a dead-heat, but Kincsem defeated Prince Giles the First in a run-off.3 The 1909 race was a dead-heat and has joint winners.

See also
 List of German flat horse races

References

 Racing Post:

 galopp-sieger.de – Grosser Preis von Baden.
 horseracingintfed.com – International Federation of Horseracing Authorities – Grosser Preis von Baden (2018).
 pedigreequery.com – Grosser Preis von Baden – Baden-Baden.
 tbheritage.com – Grosser Preis von Baden.

Open middle distance horse races
Horse races in Germany
Breeders' Cup Challenge series
Recurring sporting events established in 1858
1858 establishments in Germany